Yuan Yanping (born 4 April 1976 in Dalian, Liaoning) is a Chinese judoka, a practitioner of judo. She won a gold medal in the Women's +70 kg event at the 2008 Summer Paralympics. She won a gold medal in the same event at the 2012 Summer Paralympics and again at the 2016 Summer Paralympics.

References

Chinese female judoka
Beijing International Studies University people
Judoka at the 2008 Summer Paralympics
Judoka at the 2012 Summer Paralympics
Living people
Sportspeople from Liaoning
People from Dalian
Sportspeople from Dalian
1976 births
Paralympic judoka of China
Paralympic gold medalists for China
Medalists at the 2008 Summer Paralympics
Medalists at the 2012 Summer Paralympics
Judoka at the 2016 Summer Paralympics
Medalists at the 2016 Summer Paralympics
Paralympic medalists in judo
20th-century Chinese women
21st-century Chinese women